Cathy O'Donnell (born Ann Steely, July 6, 1923 – April 11, 1970) was an American actress who appeared in The Best Years of Our Lives, Ben-Hur, and films noir such as Detective Story and They Live by Night.

Early life
O'Donnell was born Ann Steely in Siluria, Alabama. Her father, Grady Steely, was a schoolteacher and owned a local movie theater. Her family moved to Greensboro, Alabama when she was seven, then to Oklahoma City when she was twelve. There she attended Harding Junior High School and Classen High School. She told a Boston Globe reporter in 1946 that she first became interested in acting at age fourteen after seeing Janet Gaynor in A Star Is Born. After high school she worked in a U.S. Army induction center as a stenographer. She left that job to study acting at Oklahoma City University, where she played Juliet in a college production of Romeo and Juliet. She then saved money for a two-week trip to Hollywood, where she hoped to begin a movie career.  

During her brief trip to Hollywood, an agent of Samuel Goldwyn spotted her at a drugstore. Although a screen test revealed her thick Southern accent, Goldwyn was impressed with her appearance and put her under contract. He sent her for acting and diction lessons and had her cast in local plays, including a Pasadena Playhouse dramatization of Little Women. She later changed her name to Cathy, after the female protagonist in Wuthering Heights. She then changed her last name to O'Donnell as recommended by Goldwyn's wife, who claimed that audiences loved actors with Irish last names.

Career
O'Donnell appeared on stage in Boston in Life with Father in 1944. She made her film debut as an uncredited extra in Wonder Man (1945).

Her first major film role was in 1946's The Best Years of Our Lives, playing Wilma Cameron, the high-school sweetheart of Navy veteran Homer Parrish. Homer was played by real-life World War II veteran and double amputee Harold Russell.

O'Donnell was loaned to RKO for They Live by Night (1948). Farley Granger played her love interest. The film is on The Guardian list of the top 10 noir films. The two actors appeared together again in Side Street (1950).

Later she starred in The Miniver Story (also 1950) as Judy Miniver. She had a large supporting role in Detective Story (1951) with Kirk Douglas. She appeared as Barbara Waggoman, the love interest of James Stewart's character in the western The Man from Laramie (1955). Her final film role was in Ben-Hur (1959) playing the part of Tirzah, the sister to Judah Ben-Hur.

In the 1960s she appeared in TV shows such as Perry Mason, The Rebel and Man Without a Gun. Her last screen appearance was in 1964 in an episode of Bonanza.

Personal life and death
In 1946, while acting in The Best Years of Our Lives, O'Donnell met the director William Wyler's older brother Robert Wyler. On April 11, 1948, at age 24, she married 47-year-old Robert.

On April 11, 1970, her 22nd wedding anniversary, she died after a long battle with cancer.

She is interred at Forest Lawn Memorial Park, Glendale, California.

Filmography

Films

Television

References

External links

Cathy O'Donnell at Reel Classics

1923 births
1970 deaths
20th-century American actresses
Actresses from Alabama
American film actresses
American stage actresses
American television actresses
Burials at Forest Lawn Memorial Park (Glendale)
Classen School of Advanced Studies alumni
Deaths from cancer in California
Oklahoma City University alumni
People from Shelby County, Alabama